Osman Danilo Chávez Güity (born 29 July 1984 in Santa Fé) is a Honduran footballer who plays as a center back for Honduran club CD Vida.

Club career
Chávez began his career at Platense Junior before moving to Platense. He made his professional debut on 7 October 2004 against Municipal Valencia. In 2007–08 he was loaned to F.C. Motagua and after a successful season he returned to Platese after the clubs failed to reach an agreement on a transfer fee. In 2009 Chávez had been on trial with English Premier League outfit Tottenham Hotspur and Scottish Premier League side Celtic.

On 8 August 2010, Chávez joined Polish team Wisła Kraków. He won the Ekstraklasa championship in his debut season. He was also selected to the Ekstraklasa team of the season by both Canal+ Sport as well as Przegląd Sportowy. After the season Chávez signed a new five-year contract with Wisła.

International career
He made his debut for the national side on 6 February 2008 in a friendly against Paraguay. He has represented his country at the 2009 and 2011 UNCAF Nations Cups as well as at the 2009 and 2011 CONCACAF Gold Cups.

Chávez was a key figure in Honduras's successful push for qualification to the 2010 FIFA World Cup, playing in eleven matches. At the World Cup he played in all three group stage games. At the 2014 FIFA World cup in Brazil he played one match as a second-half substitute against France national team.

Personal life
He is nicknamed "El Tierno" (The Tender or The newborn).

Honours and awards

Club
F.C. Motagua
Copa Interclubes UNCAF (1): 2007

Wisła Kraków
Ekstraklasa (1): 2010–11

Country
Honduras
Copa Centroamericana (1): 2011

Statistics 
 (correct as of 11 November 2014)

References

External links

1984 births
Living people
People from Colón Department (Honduras)
Association football defenders
Honduran footballers
Honduras international footballers
2009 UNCAF Nations Cup players
2009 CONCACAF Gold Cup players
2010 FIFA World Cup players
2011 Copa Centroamericana players
2011 CONCACAF Gold Cup players
2013 CONCACAF Gold Cup players
2014 FIFA World Cup players
Platense F.C. players
F.C. Motagua players
Wisła Kraków players
Liga Nacional de Fútbol Profesional de Honduras players
Ekstraklasa players
Honduran expatriates in Poland
Expatriate footballers in Poland
Expatriate footballers in China
Qingdao Hainiu F.C. (1990) players
China League One players
Copa Centroamericana-winning players